Hideaki Ohba (or Ōba) (Japanese: 大場秀章) (born 1943) is a Japanese botanist, pteridologist, and taxonomist. He is a professor emeritus at the University of Tokyo.

Publications

Books
 Flora of Japan. Several volumes. Kodansha, Ltd. Tokyo
 The Himalayan Plants, vv. 1-2-3 n.º 31 de Bull. (Tōkyō Daigaku. Sōgō Kenkyū Shiryōkan). 174 pp.

Honours 
 2006: professor emeritus of the University of Tokyo

References

External links 

1943 births
20th-century Japanese botanists
Pteridologists
Academic staff of the University of Tokyo
Living people
21st-century Japanese botanists
Japanese taxonomists